Weidenbach is a municipality  in the district of Ansbach in Bavaria in Germany.

History
Weidenbach was first named as "Widenwang im Schwabfeldgau" in a document from 845.
From the medieval times up to 1791 Weidenbach was part of the Principality of Ansbach. After a short time under Prussian rule the principality and, too, Weidenbach became part of the newly created Bavarian Kingdom.

References

Ansbach (district)